Achille Porcasi (January 18, 1864 – August 29, 1941) was an American composer. His work was part of the music event in the art competition at the 1932 Summer Olympics.

References

1864 births
1941 deaths
American male composers
Olympic competitors in art competitions
Musicians from Palermo
Italian emigrants to the United States